"This Side of Paradise"  is a single by Canadian rock singer Bryan Adams, his fourth and last single from his studio album Room Service, released in 2005. Unlike previous singles, "Open Road" and "Room Service", it didn't chart in the UK or Germany, but it did reach number 20 on the Billboard Adult Contemporary chart in the US.

Chart positions

References

2004 songs
2005 singles
Bryan Adams songs
Songs written by Gretchen Peters
Songs written by Bryan Adams
Universal Music Group singles